The 2015 Italian F4 Championship was the second season of the Italian Formula 4 Championship. It began on 3 May in Vallelunga and finished on 4 October in Misano after seven triple header rounds.

Teams and drivers

Race calendar and results
The calendar was published on 27 November 2014. On 15 May 2015, it was announced that the round scheduled for Franciacorta (13–14 June) would be moved to Imola, to be held over the weekend of 27–28 June.

Championship standings
Points were awarded as follows:

Drivers' standings

Teams' championship

References

External links

Italian F4 Championship seasons
Italian
F4 Championship
Italian F4